Litchfield railway station, on the Didcot, Newbury and Southampton Railway, served the small village of Litchfield, Hampshire, England. The station received relatively little traffic (only 20 passengers a week during the 1920s).

Station layout
The station was originally built with two platforms and a passing loop in the same style as other stations on the route. However, low traffic resulted in the removal of the loop in 1936, only for a longer loop and the platform to be reinstated in 1943 to deal with wartime traffic. This was then removed again in 1955, only five years before the station's closure. There was a small siding and headshunt on the northbound line but goods traffic at the station was light.

The site today
The station is a private house, not owned by C.A.H Wills who owns Litchfield farms estate and lives in the village. The station was sold by Hampshire County Council in 1978 and has been restored. The approach road is now a private drive to the property. In 1976 the Litchfield - Whitchurch bypass was opened and made use of the DN&SR trackbed south of Litchfield towards Whitchurch for a distance of one mile.

Routes

References

Disused railway stations in Hampshire
Former Great Western Railway stations
Railway stations in Great Britain opened in 1885
Railway stations in Great Britain closed in 1942
Railway stations in Great Britain opened in 1943
Railway stations in Great Britain closed in 1960